Ceboom (sometimes spelled in all caps) is a portmanteau of "Cebu" and "boom", and has been used to refer to the rapid economic development of Cebu City in the early 1990s.

Role of Typhoon Ruping
Super Typhoon Mike (PAGASA name: Ruping) crossed Cebu on November 13, 1990, destroying many houses in Cordova, sinking ships in the harbor of Cebu City, and leaving the metropolitan Cebu area without electricity and potable water. It took about a month to restore electricity.

Cebu leaders requested the national government for assistance, but because the typhoon also paralyzed vital structures in the national capital region, the request was turned down.

Boom of Cebu's economy
After the typhoon Cebu's infrastructure was updated, and two major mall chains in the country, ShoeMart or SM (now called SM Prime) and Ayala, opened outlets in the city. Road widenings and construction projects mushroomed, and traffic at the old Mactan-Mandaue Bridge (itself an engineering feat at that time) started to have bottlenecks. A second bridge was later constructed.

After effects
CEBOOM was instrumental in Emilio Mario Osmeña's confidence in bidding for the 1992 and 1998 presidential elections. It also strengthened the concept of a Federal State of Cebu.

References

Metro Cebu